Martinus Jacobus van der Heever (born 20 November 1990 in Bloemfontein, South Africa) is a South African rugby union player. His regular position is hooker.

Career

Youth and Varsity Cup rugby

Born and bred in Bloemfontein, Van der Heever played his high school rugby for Hoërskool Jim Fouché, playing in their first XV in 2007 and 2008, alongside future South African Sevens international Jamba Ulengo.

After finishing high school, Van der Heever attended the University of the Free State.

Free State Cheetahs

Van der Heever was included in the  squad for the 2012 Vodacom Cup competition, but he failed to make any appearances for the side.

Griffons

The following year, he joined Welkom-based side  during their 2013 Vodacom Cup campaign. He was again named on the bench for their match the following week against , but remained unused for the match.

Toulouse

At the end of August 2013, Van der Heever made the move to France, signing for Top 14 side  as a medical joker, along with fellow South African prop Schalk Ferreira. A last-minute substitute appearance followed in their next match against , his final appearance for the side.

He signed a one-year youth contract with the side, but failed to break into the first team.

Return to Free State Cheetahs

In January 2015, Van der Heever had a trial spell with Port Elizabeth-based side the  prior to the 2015 season.

References

South African rugby union players
Living people
1990 births
Rugby union players from Bloemfontein
Rugby union hookers
Griffons (rugby union) players